Finchford is an unincorporated community in Union Township, Black Hawk County, Iowa, United States.

History
Finchford's population was 50 in 1887, and was 36 in 1902.

References

Unincorporated communities in Black Hawk County, Iowa
Unincorporated communities in Iowa